Grafton railway station was a station on the North Coast Line or, Sydney-Brisbane railway in northern New South Wales, Australia. It was opened on 6 November 1905 as the southern terminus of the original North Coast railway line. It was closed on 1 October 1976 when South Grafton became the city's main railway station. Since 2005 the station in South Grafton is again known as Grafton Station

Although closed to passengers as the original station house burned down, the site remains in use as a goods yard.

References

Regional railway stations in New South Wales
Grafton, New South Wales
Northern Rivers
North Coast railway line, New South Wales
Disused railway stations in New South Wales
1976 disestablishments in Australia
Railway stations in Australia opened in 1905
Railway stations closed in 1976